The University of Burundi (or UB) is a public university located in Bujumbura, Burundi. Founded in 1964, it comprises eight faculties and five institutes and has a student enrollment of approximately 13,000. It is based in three campuses in Bujumbura and a fourth in Gitega. It took its current name in 1977 and is Burundi's only publicly funded university.

History  
The origins of the University of Burundi can be traced to the Agronomy Institute of the University of the Belgian Congo and Ruanda-Urundi, founded under Belgian colonial rule. In 1960 this became the Agronomical Institute of Ruanda-Urundi (Institut agronomique du Ruanda-Urundi) and moved to Bujumbura, becoming the country's first major centre of higher education. Under the initiative of the Jesuit missions, three other specialist institutions subsequently emerged in Bujumbura after Burundi's independence in 1962. These institutions were merged to form the Official University of Bujumbura (Université officielle de Bujumbura, or UOB) in January 1964. In 1977, the UOB merged with two vocational institutions to create the University of Burundi (Université du Burundi, or UB).

The Library of the University of Burundi was opened in 1981 and formally dedicated in 1985. It was reported in 1993 to have 150,000 volumes in its collection, making it one of the largest libraries in Burundi.

Teaching at the university has been significantly disrupted by political upheaval elsewhere in Burundi since independence. The Burundian Civil War (1993–2006) created particular problems, as did the accompanying socio-economic crisis which led to strikes, funding problems, and a brain drain of academic staff overseas. On 11–12 June 1995 ethnic Hutu students were massacred at the university by ethnic Tutsi. 

Its alumni include Pierre Nkurunziza who served as President of Burundi from 2005 to 2020. He studied physical education and later held a post as assistant lecturer at the university before, as a Hutu, being forced to flee in 1995. His successor, Évariste Ndayishimiye, also studied law at the university before the violence of 1995 but did not complete his studies.

UB is affiliated to the Inter-University Council for East Africa (IUCEA), Regional Universities Forum for Capacity Building in Agriculture (RUFORUM), the Agence universitaire de la Francophonie (AUF), and the Conseil Africain et Malagache pour l'enseignement supérieur (CAMES).

Schools and institutes 

The university is divided into faculties and institutes which are themselves made up of departments. As of 2018, the university was said to comprise:

Faculties

 Faculty of Agronomy and Bioengineering (Faculté d'Agronomie et de Bio-Ingénieurie)
 Faculty of Law (Faculté de Droit)
 Faculty of Medicine (Faculté de la Médecine)
 Faculty of Psychology and Educational Science (Faculté de Psychologie et des Sciences de l'Education)
 Faculty of Economic Sciences and Management (Faculté des Sciences Economiques et de Gestion)
 Faculty of Letters and Human Sciences (Faculté des Lettres et Sciences Humaine)
 Faculty of Sciences (Faculté des Sciences)
 Faculty of Engineering Sciences (Faculté des Sciences de l'Ingénieur)

Institutes

 Confucius Institute for Chinese language (Institut Confucius), affiliated to the international Confucius Institute programme 
 Institute of Applied Pedagogy (Institut de Pédagogie appliquée)
 Institute of Physical Education and Sport (Institut d'Education physique et de Sport)
 Institute of Applied Statistics (Institut des Statistiques appliquées)
 Higher Institute of Commerce (Institut supérieur de Commerce)

References

Bibliography

External links

 University of Burundi

 
Universities in Burundi
University of Bujumbura
Educational institutions established in 1964
1964 establishments in Burundi